John McHugh (October 1, 1930 – January 30, 2015) was an American Democratic politician who served as the mayor of Toledo, Ohio, from 1990 to 1993.

His daughter is Molly McHugh Branyan, a previous Democratic candidate to the Toledo City Council.

McHugh died of cancer on January 30, 2015, at the age of 84.

References

Mayors of Toledo, Ohio
Ohio Democrats
1930 births
2015 deaths